Dendrosenecio keniensis (syn. Senecio keniensis and S. brassica) is one of the giant groundsels endemic the higher altitudes of Mount Kenya. It is in the family Asteraceae and the genus Dendrosenecio (previously a Senecio).  Dendrosenecio keniodendron occurs the upper alpine zone of Mount Kenya and  D. keniensis in the wetter areas of the lower alpine or the moorlands.

Description

The branches each support a great cabbage-like, densely packed leaf-rosettes of 30–40 leaves; each branch cloaked with older, dead foliage. Branches produced near ground-level are  capable of  rooting that supports a "creeping" horizontal growth-form. The leaves are capable of secreting limited quantities of a mucilaginous fluid containing  polysaccharides. The upper leaf surface has a hair cushion which is also often coated with dried mucilage. The lower surface is covered densely with a thick, white felty covering of lantate hairs. Growth rates are very slow.

S. keniensis is frost resistant to  This ability to withstand the colder temperatures that occur in the upper altitudes of Mount Kenya is in part due (at least in Lobelias) to the large amounts of mucilage which are contained by the rosettes of leaves which that might assist in preventing the leaf bud from freezing and the reservoir of fluid from evaporating. As well as the nyctinastic behavior of the leaf rosettes which open during the day and close tightly around the leaf bud and meristem when it becomes cold at night;  the outer leaves bend inwards and form around the central leaf bud.

Each leaf rosette dies after flowering, but the plant lives on because its highly branched growth form consists of multiple rosettes.

Distribution
S. keniensis can be found in both the lower and upper alpine zone, 
although it is less common above  where it can regularly hybridise with S. keniodendron.

Name confusion 

S. keniensis has a history which includes some confusion between it and other species from other genus which belongs to a different family.  There was a mix-up in some of the materials that were collected that united the leaf of Lobelia gregoriana with the inflorescence of S. keniensis.  

At that time, Senecio keniensis was rejected as a  confused name "nomen confusum" based on the muddled samples from which made it impossible to select a single specimen, 
but that practice is no longer permitted and the replacement name S. brassica is superfluous and other names that were based on this basionym are similarly illogical and incorrectly deduced.  Examples: Fries and Fries (1922) cited the confused material for S. brassica; Hedberg (1957) selected a single specimen from among the syntypes that associated S. brassica with Fries & Fries.

Hybrid
Senecio keniensis Baker subsp. keniensis x S. keniodendron R.E.Fr. & T.C.E.Fr. ex Hell.

References

External links

 

keniensis
Endemic flora of Kenya
Mount Kenya
Afromontane flora